Isaac Sweers (occasionally Ysaack Sweerts; 1 January 1622 – 22 August 1673) was a 17th-century Dutch vice-admiral with the Admiralty of Amsterdam who fought in the Anglo-Dutch Wars.

Bibliography 

1622 births
1673 deaths
Admirals of the navy of the Dutch Republic
Dutch military personnel killed in action
Dutch naval personnel of the Anglo-Dutch Wars
People from Nijmegen